ELPC may refer to:
 East Liberty Presbyterian Church in Pittsburgh, Pennsylvania
 Environmental Law and Policy Center